Carrick-on-Suir is a town in County Tipperary, Ireland. It lies on both banks of the River Suir. The part on the north bank of the Suir lies in the civil parish of "Carrick", in the historical barony of Iffa and Offa East. The part on the south bank lies in the civil parish of Kilmolerin in the barony of Upperthird, County Waterford.

Location
Carrick-on-Suir is situated in the south-eastern corner of South Tipperary, 21 kilometres (13 miles) east of Clonmel and 27 kilometres (17 miles) northwest of Waterford. Most of the town lies north of the river in the townland of Carrig Mór (Big Rock), with the remainder of the town on the opposite bank in the townland of Carrig Beg (Small Rock). The town is connected to Limerick and Waterford by the N24 road and a rail link. Carrick-on-Suir railway station opened on 15 April 1853. Two trains a day operate to Waterford and two trains a day operate to Limerick Junction via Clonmel, Cahir and Tipperary. There is no train service on Sundays. Several buses also run on this route. There is a recently refurbished riverside walk to Clonmel named the Blueway allowing visitors to walk or cycle along a scenic riverside path. This has recently been upgraded and replanted.

For the purposes of elections to Dáil Éireann, the town is part of the Tipperary constituency.

History

Influence of the Butler family
Carrick-on-Suir (originally called Carrig Mac Griffin) was formed on an island settlement upstream of Waterford. The town remained as an island until the 18th century when small rivers were diverted to form dry land north and west of the town. The earliest known records of a settlement are dated to 1247, when a charter of 3 fairs per year was awarded to Matthew Fitzgriffin, Lord of the manor of Carrick who was a member of the Cambro-Norman nobility.

By the early 14th century, Carrick Mac Griffin had become home to a prosperous Hiberno-Norman family – the Butlers. The first significant leader of the Butler clan, Edmond Butler (a.k.a. Edmund le Bottilier) was created Earl of Carrick in 1315. However, his son James did not inherit the title. Instead, 7 years after the death of his father, he was created Earl of Ormond in his own right. In 1447, Edmund MacRichard Butler founded the first bridge over the estuary at Carrick-on-Suir.
Other notable members of the Butler clan were Thomas Butler, 10th Earl of Ormond (a.k.a. Black Tom) who built the Tudor Manor House extension to Ormonde Castle and James the 12th Earl and 1st Duke of Ormond, who founded the town's woollen industry in 1670.

Edmond le Bottiler erected two large, heavily garrisoned castle keeps named the Plantagenet Castle on the north bank of the Suir, just east of what is now Main St. In the 15th century, a four towered castle was erected on the same site, two of which are now incorporated into the Elizabethan Manor House built by Black Tom Butler, c. 1560. The Manor House, where Archbishop Dermot O'Hurley, one of the most celebrated of the 24 Irish Catholic Martyrs, was arrested in 1583, still stands today, having been extensively refurbished by the Irish State in the 1990s and is open to the public.

The town was also the inspiration for the 16th-century song, Cailín ó chois na Siúire mé, which is attested to as early as 1595 and mentioned in William Shakespeare's Henry V as Caleno custure me.

In 1649, the town was taken by English Parliamentarians during the Cromwellian conquest of Ireland. They captured Carrick by stealth after discovering an undefended gate as part of operations during the Siege of Waterford. Irish troops from Ulster under a Major Geoghegan tried to re-take Carrick but were eventually beaten off with the loss of over 500 killed.

In 1670 the Butlers set up a woollen industry in the town. By 1799, the town enjoyed some prosperity from the woollen industry, fishing, basket weaving and other river-related businesses – the population reached around 11,000 by this point. In that year, a barge capsized on the river near the bride, resulting in the deaths of around 91 people. Over the next 120 years however, the town suffered from high taxes and levies imposed by the British on the woollen industry, leading to high unemployment, poverty and emigration. The Great Famine also contributed greatly to the depopulation of the town.

20th century
With the coming of Independence and the Civil War, Carrick was initially occupied by the Anti-Treaty IRA until the town fell to the Free State army in 1922. By this stage, industrialisation had reached Carrick with the establishment of cotton factories and a local creamery. Most significant however for the economic development of the town was the arrival of the tanning industry in the 1930s, providing regular, dependable employment in the town for the first time. The local town council also embarked on building social housing projects in an effort to deal with appalling living conditions in the town for those economically disadvantaged. Despite these developments, economic opportunities were limited and poverty widespread – the town saw widespread emigration to Dublin, Britain and further afield especially during the long recessions of the 1940s and 1950s.

The closure of the Pollack & Plunder tannery in 1985 caused immense hardship in the town, as a significant proportion of the population (Carrick's population was roughly 4,000 by this point) were employed there or were dependent on someone who was. Carrick suffered a prolonged recession throughout the 1980s and early 1990s, again leading the population to drop due to emigration – a fate
suffered by other small, rural Irish towns during the period. By the late-1990s, the economy of the town was on the upswing – unemployment had dropped, the SRAM bicycle component factory had opened as had numerous small businesses, and the population began to increase again for the first time in two centuries.

Carrick's local infrastructure (in particular health and transport) still remains relatively undeveloped, due to its location on the border of 3 counties (and subsequent lack of political muscle both at county and national level), and the nearby larger towns of Clonmel and Waterford. As of 2006, no large manufacturing operation remains in the town – the SRAM plant closed in 2006, but Carrick continues to prosper economically. The population continues to increase, and the town expands with ongoing significant house building projects. The future of Carrick is likely to be that of a commuter town, servicing those working in Waterford and Clonmel – a role it has been performing for decades.

Features and amenities
There are two theatres in Carrick-on-Suir, the Brewery Lane Theatre and the Operatic Society. While the Operatic society tends to focus on musicals, operas and pantomimes, Brewery Lane usually does dramas which can be serious, or often black comedy. Many of these are Irish.

River Suir
Carrick-on-Suir is the tidal limit of the River Suir. Carrick has a 1-in-50-year flood defence system with quay walls ranging in height from 1.2m to 1.5m. Currently, the walls give protection from flooding caused by high tides.  Flooding still occurs along the Glen/Mill River and Markievicz Tce.

Landmarks
In 1447, a stone bridge was built, now known as the "Old Bridge". A new, more modern bridge (later named after John Dillon) was built in the early 20th century. The central part of the Old Bridge (and likewise the Dillon bridge) was destroyed by retreating IRA forces in 1922 in an attempt to slow the advance of the Free State army, but both were rebuilt by 1927.

The West Gate on the street of the same name is the last remaining gates of the town wall.

Several, at times very narrow lanes (Oven Lane, Cook Lane, Rowe's Lane etc.) leading off Main Street are testament to the Medieval layout of the town.

Carrick's town clock was erected in 1784. A public park was created in the fair green in the 1860s. The town fair continues to this day, having been moved from the fair green in the 1920s to a new site just west of the fair green.

Churches
There are three Catholic churches. The largest church in Carrick Mór is St Nicholas' church which was built in 1879, replacing an earlier church of the same name built in 1804. In Carrick Beg are the small St Molleran's parish church (parts of which date back to the 13th century) and the larger Franciscan friary. The Franciscan order's presence in Carrick dates back to 1336 with the granting of land for a friary by the 1st Earl of Ormond. However, the suppression of monasteries by Henry VIII led to the closure of the friary. Just prior to the invasion of Ireland by Cromwell, the friars had returned for an 11-year period, before being shut down again and the friars having to go underground to avoid persecution. It was not until 1820 and the onset of Catholic emancipation that the friars were able to fully return and a new chapel was built. The friars served the local community until the lack of vocations to the order led to the order finally leaving Carrick-Beg in 2006.

Before the Irish War of Independence, the Church of Ireland community was relatively substantial. After returning to Ireland from Newfoundland, famous 18th century Bard Donnchadh Ruadh Mac Conmara briefly converted to Protestantism and read aloud an Oath of Abjuration inside the Church of Ireland parish at Carrick-on-Suir. More recently, however, the former Protestant church on Main Street was abandoned until the late 1980s, but the church building and grounds have both been renovated and now serve as a heritage centre.

Sport
GAA is represented in the area by Carrick Davins (named after the first GAA president Maurice Davin), Carrick Swans and St. Molleran's GAA clubs. The former two play in the Tipperary GAA area, and the latter in the Waterford GAA area. The 1904 All-Ireland Senior Hurling Championship final was played in Carrick-on-Suir. The match was held on Maurice Davin's land on 24 June 1906 between Cork and Kilkenny. Kilkenny won by a single point, 1–9 to 1–8.

Carrick United AFC is a junior (non-league, amateur) soccer team that plays in the Waterford & District League. The club plays at Tom Drohan park, and has had some success in the Waterford & District League, Munster Senior and Junior Cups and also in the FAI Junior Cup.

An amateur rugby team, Carrick-on-Suir RFC, plays in the Munster Junior League Division II. The club grounds are located east of the town in Tybroughney, County Kilkenny.

There is an 18-hole golf club, golf driving range, and swimming pool in the area. Castleview Lawn Tennis Club has four artificial grass courts, and Carrick-on Suir Handball and Racquetball Club is at Davin Park Indoor courts, Clonmel Road.

In cycling, Sean Kelly and Sam Bennett are both from the town, both of whom have won the points classification in the Tour de France. The town is home to the Carrick Wheelers road club.

There are also two boxing clubs (Carrick-on-Suir Boxing Club and St. Nicholas Boxing Club) and a triathlon club.

1986 English Greyhound Derby champion Tico was born in the town.

Clubs and societies
The Carrick-on-Suir Musical Society (formed in 1943) is a musical and amateur operatic society. The Musical Society bought and refurbished the Strand Theatre on Main Street in 2003 for use by the Society. The Brewery Lane Drama Society (formed in 1955) performs several productions a year at their 75-person capacity theatre, which was formerly a malt house owned by Smithwicks.

The Irish Traction Group is based in Carrick-on-Suir, where restoration work is carried out on vintage diesel locomotives.

Carrick-on-Suir also has a Republican Flute Band which plays at many Irish Republican and Sinn Féin events.

Carrick Swim Club (Carrick Dippers) use the Sean Kelly Sports Centre as their base.

Notable people
Notable people from the town include:
 Dorothea Herbert (1770–1829), writer
 Clancy Brothers, folk music group
Paddy Clancy, singer, harmonicist
Tom Clancy, singer, actor, 
Bobby Clancy, singer and banjo, guitar, harmonica, and bodhrán player
Liam Clancy, singer, guitarist, concertina player
 Finbarr Clancy, singer, guitar, banjo, flute and bass with folk group The High Kings.
 Maurice Davin, first President of the Gaelic Athletic Association, 1884–1887
 Michael Anthony Fleming, Roman Catholic bishop of St John's, Newfoundland
 Daryl Kavanagh, footballer for St Patrick's Athletic
 Sean Kelly, cyclist
 Gertrude Kelly, doctor and activist 
 Sam Bennett, cyclist
 Tom Kiely, Olympic decathlon gold medalist at the 1904 Summer Olympics, from Ballyneale, just outside the town.
 John Lonergan, recipient of the United States Government's Medal of Honor
 Fiona Glascott, actress
 Mick Roche, former Tipperary hurler
 Gerard Hogan, academic, constitutional lawyer, former judge of the Irish High Court and Court of Appeal and former Advocate-General of the Court of Justice of the European Union. Current judge of the Irish Supreme Court.

References

External links

 Carrick-on-Suir official website
 A history of Carrick-on-Suir from DiscoverIreland.ie 

 
Iffa and Offa East
Parishes of the Roman Catholic Diocese of Waterford and Lismore
Towns and villages in County Tipperary